Ayari ( adjective of  عَيّار  ayyār "vagabond, scoundrel") 
is a Maghrebi (Tunisian, Algerian) and Persian surname.

More than 400 people with the name live in France (i.e. Maghrebis in France). 
An estimated 114 people with this surname lived in Germany as of 2017.

Notable people with the surname include:
 Kianoush Ayari (born 1951), Iranian writer and director
 Soheil Ayari (born 1970), French-Iranian race car driver
 Anis Ayari (born 1982), Tunisian footballer
 Hassine Ayari (born 1985), Tunisian Greco-Roman wrestler
 Hela Ayari (born 1994), Tunisian judoka
 Khaled Ayari (born 1990), Tunisian footballer 
 Hamadi Ayari (born 1991), French-Tunisian footballer
 Kamel Ayari, Tunisian wheelchair racer
 Yasin Ayari (born 2003), Swedish footballer (with parents from Tunisia and Morocco)

References 

Arabic-language surnames
Persian-language surnames